WQSL (92.3 FM), also known as "The River", is a variety hits radio station licensed to Jacksonville, North Carolina. The station simulcasts on WQZL 101.1 FM Belhaven.

History
WQSL was "Q92" when it was Top 40 and then it was a Hot AC In the early 1990s it was "Whistle 92.3". From 1995 to 2000 it was "All Hit 92.3" Then the station switched to Hip hop.

On April 30, 1997, Cumulus Broadcasting announced its purchase of WAAV, WWQQ, WXQR, and WQSL.

WQSL was rhythmic CHR and its name was "The Beat of Carolina" until the end of 2006, at which time it changed to rhythmic adult contemporary with the name "The Party Station". At the end of 2007, WQSL changed to urban adult contemporary with The Touch format from ABC Radio Networks and the Rickey Smiley morning show.

On August 29, 2013, at noon, the station flipped to a stunt of 1960s-leaning classic hits as "Oldies 92" before flipping to an adult hits simulcast with WQZL as "92.3/101.1 Jack FM" at noon the following day.

On December 16, 2013, the station changed their format from adult hits to a country simulcast with WQZL, branded as "The Wolf".

In September 2017, Dick Broadcasting announced the purchase of Alpha Media stations in three markets — 18 stations and two translators in total, at a purchase price of $19.5 million. The acquisition of WQSL by Dick Broadcasting was consummated on December 20, 2017.

On July 6, 2018, WQSL changed their format from country to variety hits, branded as "92.3 & 101.1 The River".

Previous logo
WQSL's logo under its previous "Jack FM" format was the same as the one being used by the Canadian radio station CJET-FM.

References

External links
NextMedia website

QSL
Adult hits radio stations in the United States